The 2019 Shanghai SIPG F.C. season is Shanghai SIPG's 7th consecutive season in the Chinese Super League ever since it started back in the 2004 season and 7th consecutive season in the top flight of Chinese football. This season Shanghai SIPG participates in the Chinese Super League, Chinese FA Cup, Chinese FA Super Cup and AFC Champions League.

Transfers and loans

Squad

First-team squad

Reserve squad

Squad statistics

Appearances and goals

|-
! colspan=14 style=background:#dcdcdc; text-align:center| Players transferred out during the season

Disciplinary Record

Friendlies

Pre-season

Competitions

Chinese Super League

Table

Results summary

Results by round

Matches
All times are local (UTC+8).

Source:

Chinese FA Cup

Chinese FA Super Cup

AFC Champions League

Group stage

Round of 16

Quarter-finals

References

Shanghai Port F.C. seasons
Shanghai SIPG F.C.